Wushan is a subdistrict of Wangcheng District, Changsha, Hunan, China. It is located on the south bank, the lower reaches of Wei river, near the estuary. the subdistrict is bordered by Gaotangling to the north and east, Jinzhou of Ningxiang and Bairuopu to the west, Huangjinyuan and Baishazhou to the south. The subdistrict has 11 villages and four residential communities under its jurisdiction, the administrative centre is at Yujiaqiao.

Subdivision
At merging of Wushan and Yujiapo on November 19, 2015, the new formed subdistrict had 12 villages and four residential communities. At the adjustment of village-level  administrative divisions on March 23, 2016, Chayuan and Jijiaxiang were merged as a new formed village of Weizi; the subdistrict has four residential communities and 11 villages in 2016.

History

Pre-Wushan

Yujiapo
The Yujiapo subdistrict was formed from a portion of Gaotangling On August 28, 2012. There was a population of 40,794, it covered  with Yujiapo, Renhe and Wangwanglu three residential communities under its jurisdiction. It was merged to Wushan on November 19, 2015.

References

Township-level divisions of Wangcheng
Wangcheng